Valerian Tristanovich Bestayev (born 5 March 1982) is a former Russian professional footballer. He made his debut in the Russian Premier League in 2001 for FC Alania Vladikavkaz.

External links

1982 births
Living people
Russian footballers
FC Spartak Vladikavkaz players
FC Anzhi Makhachkala players
Russian Premier League players
FC Volgar Astrakhan players
Sportspeople from Vladikavkaz
Association football defenders